Manoel Carlos Gonçalves de Almeida (born March 14, 1933), popularly known as Maneco, is a Brazilian screenwriter, director, producer and actor. He is the father of actress Júlia Almeida.

References

External links

1933 births
Living people
People from São Paulo
Authors of Brazilian telenovelas
Brazilian male writers
Male television writers